Cipriano Elis de la Hoz (26 September 1907 – 14 January 1984) was a Spanish racing cyclist. He rode in the 1928 Tour de France.

References

External links
 

1907 births
1984 deaths
Spanish male cyclists
Place of birth missing
People from Camargo, Cantabria
Cyclists from Cantabria